Statistics of Austrian Football Bundesliga in the 1984–85 season.

Overview
It was contested by 16 teams, and FK Austria Wien won the championship.

Teams and location

Teams of 1984–85 Austrian Football Bundesliga
FC Admira/Wacker
Austria Salzburg
Austria Wien
Donawitzer
Eisenstadt
Favoritner
First Vienna
Grazer AK
Kärnten
LASK
Rapid Wien
Spittal/Drau
Sturm Graz
VÖEST Linz
Wacker Innsbruck
Wiener Sport-Club

League standings

Results

References
Austria - List of final tables (RSSSF)

Austrian Football Bundesliga seasons
Austria
1984–85 in Austrian football